Mount Duval is the name of several geographic features including: 

Mount Duval (New South Wales) - Australia
Mount Duval (Nunavut) - Canada
Mount Duval - Antarctica